Sir John Soundy  (14 November 1878 – 25 October 1960) was an Australian politician.

He was born in Dorchester, Dorset, England. In 1925 he was elected to the Tasmanian House of Assembly as a Nationalist member for Denison. He concurrently served as Lord Mayor of Hobart from 1938 until 1946, when he resigned from the House to contest the Legislative Council seat of Hobart, successfully. He was Chair of Committees from 1948 to 1952, when he retired from politics. Knighted in 1954, Soundy died in Hobart in 1960.

References

1878 births
1960 deaths
Nationalist Party of Australia members of the Parliament of Tasmania
Independent members of the Parliament of Tasmania
Members of the Tasmanian House of Assembly
Members of the Tasmanian Legislative Council
Australian Knights Bachelor
Australian politicians awarded knighthoods
Australian Commanders of the Order of the British Empire
English emigrants to Australia
Politicians from Dorset
Politicians awarded knighthoods
Mayors and Lord Mayors of Hobart
Tasmanian local councillors